The Rosario Board of Trade (BCR) is a non-profit making association based in Rosario, in the Province of Santa Fe, Argentina. Founded on August 18, 1884, it serves as a forum for the conduct of trade negotiations in several markets including grain, oilseed, agricultural products and their by-products, as well as securities and other assets.

Grain Market 
The Physical Grain Market of the BCR is the most important in Argentina in terms of its volume of operations, and provides reference prices for the national and international markets. Most of the country's production of cereals and oilseeds is traded within it, especially soybean. The region around Rosario contains more than 80% of the vegetable oil industry of Argentina and its ports, (Rosario and San Lorenzo-Puerto San Martín), handle more than 90% of the Argentine export of soybean and its derivatives.
The Board of Trade additionally operates a complex of laboratories which analyze and provide quality certifications for samples of agricultural products, soil and water.

Futures Exchange  
The Rosario Futures Exchange (ROFEX) has traditionally been a futures exchange for commodities and, in more recent times, for financial products such as exchange rate and interest rate options. Its negotiated volume (especially in forward contracts over dollars) makes ROFEX the largest futures market in the country.

Stock Exchange  

Livestock Market 
The Rosario Livestock Market (abbreviated Rosgan) is an important Argentine livestock auction market, notably for cattle.

History 
Operating in a landmark Beaux-Arts headquarters designed by Raúl Rivero in 1926, the exchange had new offices built during the 1990s. Designed by architect Mario Roberto Álvarez, the new building was completed in 1998.

References

External links
 Rosario Board of Trade 
 Mercado Argentino de Valores S.A 
 ROFEX (Rosario Futures Exchange) 
 Argentina Clearing S.A. 
 ROSGAN

Buildings and structures in Rosario, Santa Fe
Economy of Argentina
Business organisations based in Argentina
Non-profit organisations based in Argentina
Commodity exchanges
Financial services companies established in 1884
Organizations established in 1884
Futures exchanges
1884 establishments in Argentina
Office buildings completed in 1926
Office buildings completed in 1998
Financial services companies of Argentina
Stock exchanges in South America
Chambers of commerce
Argentine auction houses